The canton of Broons is an administrative division of the Côtes-d'Armor department, northwestern France. Its borders were modified at the French canton reorganisation which came into effect in March 2015. Its seat is in Broons.

It consists of the following communes:
 
Broons
Caulnes
La Chapelle-Blanche
Éréac
Gomené
Guenroc
Guitté
Illifaut
Lanrelas
Laurenan
Loscouët-sur-Meu
Mégrit
Merdrignac
Mérillac
Plumaudan
Plumaugat
Rouillac
Saint-Jouan-de-l'Isle
Saint-Launeuc
Saint-Maden
Saint-Vran
Sévignac
Trédias
Trémeur
Trémorel
Yvignac-la-Tour

References

Cantons of Côtes-d'Armor